The Forbidden Woman is a 1920 American silent drama film produced and directed by Harry Garson and starring Clara Kimball Young.

Cast
Clara Kimball Young as Diane Sorel
Conway Tearle as Malcolm Kent
Jiquel Lanoe as Andrew De Clermont
Kathryn Adams as Madame De Clermont
Winter Hall as Edward Harding
Milla Davenport as Luisa
Stanton Williams as Jimmy
John MacKinnon as The Butler

Preservation
A complete print of The Forbidden Woman is preserved in the Library of Congress film collection.

References

External links

1920 films
American silent feature films
American black-and-white films
Silent American drama films
1920 drama films
Film Booking Offices of America films
Films directed by Harry Garson
1920s American films